The 2019 New Zealand Open (officially known as the Barfoot & Thompson New Zealand Open 2019 for sponsorship reasons) was a badminton tournament which took place at Eventfinda Stadium in Auckland, New Zealand, from 30 April to 5 May 2019 and had a total purse of $150,000.

Tournament
The 2019 New Zealand Open was the eleventh tournament of the 2019 BWF World Tour and also part of the New Zealand Open championships which had been held since 1990. This tournament was organized by the Badminton New Zealand and sanctioned by the BWF.

Venue
This international tournament was held at Eventfinda Stadium in Auckland, New Zealand.

Point distribution
Below is the point distribution table for each phase of the tournament based on the BWF points system for the BWF World Tour Super 300 event.

Prize money
The total prize money for this tournament was US$150,000. Distribution of prize money had in accordance with BWF regulations.

Men's singles

Seeds

 Anthony Sinisuka Ginting (quarter-finals)
 Tommy Sugiarto (second round)
 Jonatan Christie (champion)
 Kenta Nishimoto (first round)
 Kanta Tsuneyama (semi-finals)
 Ng Ka Long (final)
 Lin Dan (semi-finals)
 Khosit Phetpradab (first round)

Wild card
Badminton New Zealand awarded a wild card entry to Abhinav Manota.

Finals

Top half

Section 1

Section 2

Bottom half

Section 3

Section 4

Women's singles

Seeds

 Akane Yamaguchi (semi-finals)
 Saina Nehwal (first round)
 Beiwen Zhang (quarter-finals)
 Sayaka Takahashi (quarter-finals)
 Gregoria Mariska Tunjung (quarter-finals)
 Li Xuerui (final)
 Aya Ohori (semi-finals)
 Chen Xiaoxin (first round)

Wild card
Badminton New Zealand awarded a wild card entry to Sally Fu.

Finals

Top half

Section 1

Section 2

Bottom half

Section 3

Section 4

Men's doubles

Seeds

 Takeshi Kamura / Keigo Sonoda (semi-finals)
 Mohammad Ahsan / Hendra Setiawan (champions)
 Hiroyuki Endo / Yuta Watanabe (final)
 Takuto Inoue / Yuki Kaneko (quarter-finals)
 Lee Yang / Wang Chi-lin (quarter-finals)
 Liao Min-chun / Su Ching-heng (first round)
 Goh V Shem / Tan Wee Kiong (semi-finals)
 Aaron Chia / Soh Wooi Yik (quarter-finals)

Wild card
Badminton New Zealand awarded a wild card entry to Riga Oud / Daxxon Vong.

Finals

Top half

Section 1

Section 2

Bottom half

Section 3

Section 4

Women's doubles

Seeds

 Yuki Fukushima / Sayaka Hirota (semi-finals)
 Misaki Matsutomo / Ayaka Takahashi (final)
 Mayu Matsumoto / Wakana Nagahara (quarter-finals)
 Chen Qingchen / Jia Yifan (withdrew)
 Greysia Polii / Apriyani Rahayu (withdrew)
 Shiho Tanaka / Koharu Yonemoto (second round)
 Lee So-hee / Shin Seung-chan (withdrew)
 Gabriela Stoeva / Stefani Stoeva (second round)

Wild card
Badminton New Zealand awarded a wild card entry to Sally Fu / Alyssa Tagle.

Finals

Top half

Section 1

Section 2

Bottom half

Section 3

Section 4

Mixed doubles

Seeds

 Yuta Watanabe / Arisa Higashino (withdrew)
 Chan Peng Soon / Goh Liu Ying (champions)
 Goh Soon Huat / Shevon Jemie Lai (quarter-finals)
 Hafiz Faizal / Gloria Emanuelle Widjaja (semi-finals)
 Praveen Jordan / Melati Daeva Oktavianti (final)
 Rinov Rivaldy / Pitha Haningtyas Mentari (first round)
 Mark Lamsfuß / Isabel Herttrich (quarter-finals)
 Marvin Seidel / Linda Efler (first round)

Wild card
Badminton New Zealand awarded a wild card entry to Maika Phillips / Anona Pak.

Finals

Top half

Section 1

Section 2

Bottom half

Section 3

Section 4

References

External links
 Tournament Link
 Official Website

New Zealand Open (badminton)
New Zealand Open
New Zealand Open (badminton)
New Zealand Open (badminton)